Svein Ingvar Gjedrem (born 25 January 1950 in Finnøy) is a Norwegian economist and former Governor of the Central Bank of Norway.

He graduated in political economy from the University of Oslo in 1975, worked as a consultant in the Central Bank of Norway from 1975 to 1979 and in the Ministry of Finance from 1979 to 1998. He served two terms as Central Bank Governor from 1 January 1999. In June 2011, Gjedrem got his position as permanent under-secretary of the Ministry of Finance back. He remained here until 2015.

In the late 1960s and early 1970s Gjedrem played football for Viking and Lyn.

Gjedrem’s successor as Governor of the Central Bank of Norway was Øystein Olsen who was appointed in October 2010 and took over on 1 January 2011.

Gjedrem has accepted a part-time position at the Norwegian School of Economics and Business Administration, and started teaching in 2011.

References

1950 births
Living people
Governors of the Central Bank of Norway
Norwegian economists
Norwegian footballers
Viking FK players
Lyn Fotball players
Association footballers not categorized by position